Sudha Chandran (born 27 September 1965) is an Indian Bharatanatyam dancer and actress who appears in Indian television and films. In 1981, she hurt her leg in a road accident near Tiruchirapalli, Tamil Nadu while coming back from Madras with her parents. Her leg became gangrenous and her parents opted to have it amputated. However, she subsequently became an established Bharatnatyam dancer. Chandran is known for her roles of Ramola Sikand in Kaahin Kissii Roz, Yamini Singh and Seema Gujral in Naagin 1, 2, 3 and 6, Chitradevi in Deivam Thandha Veedu, the Tamil remake of Saath Nibhana Saathiya. 
She was awarded National Film Award – Special Jury Award for the Telugu film Mayuri which is based on her life at 33rd National Film Awards in 1985.

She was a contestant on the reality dance series Jhalak Dikhhla Jaa.

Early and personal life 
Sudha Chandran was born in Mumbai. She had stated in an interview of Nettavu, that she was born and raised in Mumbai, but her family originates from Vayalur, Tiruchirappalli, Tamil Nadu. Her father K.D. Chandran, worked at USIS and was a former actor. Sudha Chandran earned her B.A. from Mithibai College, Mumbai and subsequently an M.A. in economics.

In May 1981, at about 16 years old, in Tamil Nadu, Chandran met with an accident in which her legs were wounded. She received initial medical treatment of her injuries at a local hospital and was later admitted to Vijaya Hospital at Madras. After doctors discovered that gangrene had formed on her right leg, amputation was required. Chandran says that this period was the toughest time of her life. She subsequently regained some mobility with the help of a prosthetic Jaipur foot. She returned to dancing after a gap of two years and performed in India, Saudi Arabia, United States, UK, Canada, UAE, Qatar, Kuwait, Bahrain , Yemen and Oman. Sudha Chandran married assistant director Ravi Dang in 1994. She was given an honorary doctorate by Invertis University, Bareilly.

Career 

Chandran started her career with a Telugu film Mayuri, which was based on her own life.

Filmography

Television
Serials

Shows

Other works

Awards 
 1985: National Film Award – Special Jury Award for Mayuri
 1985: Nandi Special Jury Award for Mayuri
 2017: Colors Golden Petal Award for Best Actor in a Comic Role for Naagin 
 2020: Zeetelugu kutumbam awards for Uttama Inti pedda main lead role in No.1Kodalu

References

External links

 

1965 births
Living people
Actresses in Malayalam cinema
Indian television actresses
Actresses in Hindi television
Indian film actresses
Indian amputees
Mithibai College alumni
Indian soap opera actresses
Actresses in Hindi cinema
Actresses in Tamil cinema
Actresses in Kannada cinema
Actresses in Telugu cinema
20th-century Indian actresses
21st-century Indian actresses
Actresses in Malayalam television
Special Jury Award (feature film) National Film Award winners
Dancers from Maharashtra
Actresses in Tamil television
Actresses from Mumbai
Actresses in Telugu television
Bharatiya Janata Party politicians from Maharashtra